Shankarrao Gadakh (born 29 May 1970 in the village of Sonai, Maharashtra, India) is Member of Maharashtra Legislative Assembly from Nevasa. Gadakh had wrested the Nevasa seat from the BJP in the 2019 assembly polls by defeating BJP candidate with a convincing margin. He is member of the Shiv Sena and former minister of Soil and Water Conservation in Government of Maharashtra.

Having entered politics in 1995 at the age of 25, Gadakh began as a Youth Congress campaigner.
In 2017 he founded the party Krantikari Shetkari Party and fought local elections. Krantikari Paksha now has 5 Ahmednagar Zilla Parishad members, 12 Nevasa Panchayat Samiti members and 9 Nagarsevaks in Nevasa. He is also known as "Panidar Aamdar" by his constituency for his good work during drought like conditions in Nevasa constituency.

On 11 August 2020 he dissolved Krantikari Shetkari Paksha and joined Shiv Sena.

Positions held
 2009: Elected to Maharashtra Legislative Assembly
 2019: Elected to Maharashtra Legislative Assembly
 2019: Appointed minister of Soil and Water Conservation in the Government of Maharashtra
 2020: Appointed guardian minister of Osmanabad district

See also
Uddhav Thackeray ministry

References

External links
http://myneta.info/mh2009/candidate.php?candidate_id=2888
http://103.23.150.75/ECI/Affidavits/S13/SE/221/GADAKH%20SHANKARRAO%20YASHWNTRAO/GADAKH%20SHANKARRAO%20YASHWNTRAO.htm
http://www.dnaindia.com/mumbai/report-gadakh-may-quit-congress-join-ncp-1238315
https://divyamarathi.bhaskar.com/news/MAH-WMAH-AHM-mla-shankarrao-gadakh-in-nagar-4438757-NOR.html
http://m.maharashtratimes.com/maharashtra/ahmednagar-news/nevasa-zp-election/articleshow/57319104.cms

Krantikari Shetkari Party politicians
Shiv Sena politicians
Maharashtra MLAs 2009–2014
1970 births
Living people